W is a 2016 South Korean television series, starring Lee Jong-suk and Han Hyo-joo. Consisting of 16 episodes, it aired on Wednesdays and Thursdays at 22:00 (KST) on MBC from July 20 to September 14, 2016. W centers on the clash between "two worlds": the real world and an alternate universe inside a webtoon, from which the title of the television series was taken.

The series received praise for its unique premise and ranked first in Content Power Index in its premiere week. It achieved modest ratings of 11.63%, topping viewership ratings in its time slot for its entire run.

Plot

A romance takes place between Kang Chul (Lee Jong-Suk), who is super rich and exist in the webtoon “W,” and Oh Yeon-Joo (Han Hyo-Joo) who is a surgeon in the real world.

Episodes

Cast

Main
 Lee Jong-suk as Kang Cheol
The lead character of the popular comic series W. He is the co-CEO of the e-commerce company JN Global, owner of broadcasting channel W, and an Olympic gold medalist in shooting in his youth. His family was murdered by an elusive murderer, yet Kang Cheol was immediately suspected to be the killer due to his shooting background. After being proven innocent, Kang Cheol seeks vengeance on the murderer through his broadcasting channel W. When he is stabbed on the rooftop of his penthouse by the murderer, he meets Oh Yeon-joo who saves his life and with whom he falls in love.
 Han Hyo-joo as Oh Yeon-joo
 Hyun Seung-min as teenage Yeon-joo
 Park Min-ha as child Yeon-joo
A second-year resident cardiothoracic surgeon in Myung-sei Hospital. She is the daughter of the Oh Seong-moo, author and illustrator of the famous webtoon W. A fan of her father's work, she goes to his studio to investigate his sudden disappearance. There, she is pulled into W's alternate universe and meets its protagonist Kang Cheol, with whom she eventually falls in love.

Supporting

Characters from the webtoon W
 Kim Eui-sung as Han Sang-hoon
The real killer of Kang Cheol's family. His identity is not revealed until much later, and his face resembles the comic series's author Oh Seong-moo. Before Seong-moo gives him a name and face, he mostly appears as a shadowy, faceless human form.
 Jung Yoo-jin as Yoon So-hee
Kang Cheol's long-time secretary and his friend since they were in high school. Her romantic feelings for Kang Cheol are subtly alluded to throughout the series through her actions and behavior around him, which lead to readers’ general expectations of their marriage. Originally intended to be the main female character who would later become Kang Cheol's love interest, she is replaced by Yeon-joo when Kang Cheol falls in love with her.
 Lee Tae-hwan as Seo Do-yoon
Kang Cheol's loyal bodyguard and close friend. Using his knowledge of martial arts, he trained Kang Cheol to fight and is always alongside him in beating bad guys.
 Park Won-sang as Han Cheol-ho
A secondary antagonist of the webtoon. He is a power-hungry prosecutor and a member of Congress who is also the presidential prospect of a new democratic party. To gain political popularity, he becomes the prosecutor in charge of Kang Cheol's case when the latter was accused of his family's murder.
  as Son Hyun-seok
The director of Project W, a program specializing in criminal investigation, and the general manager of the broadcasting channel W.

People around Oh Yeon-joo
 Kim Eui-sung as Oh Seong-moo
Yeon-joo's father and a famous artist who created the webtoon W. Once a failed webtoon artist, alcoholic and divorcé, he gains popularity from W. However, he notices that his webtoon and its characters have taken on a reality of their own. As a result, he perceives Kang Cheol as a monster and seeks to eliminate him.
 Lee Si-eon as Park Soo-bong
An apprentice of Seong-moo and confidante of Yeon-joo
 Nam Gi-ae as Gil Soo-sun
Yeon-joo's mother and Seong-moo's ex-wife.
  as Park Min-soo
Cardiothoracic surgeon and Professor at Myung-sei Hospital. He is a passionate fan of W
 Kang Ki-young as Kang Suk-beom
Second-year resident cardiothoracic surgeon at Myung-sei Hospital and Yeon-joo's friend
  as Gil Soo-young
Yeon-joo's aunt
 Ryu Hye-rin as Sun-mi
Seung-moo's apprentice
  as Yoon-hee
Seung-moo's apprentice

Extended

Special appearances 
  as Kang Yoon – Cheol's father
 Kim Na-woon as Yoon Mi-ho – Cheol's mother (episode 1)
 Seo Shin-ae as Kang Soo-yeon – Cheol's sister (episode 1)
 Choi Min-young as Kang Joon-seok – Cheol's brother (episode 1)
 Hwang Seok-jeong as Webtoon Writer (episode 6)
 Ahn Se-ha as Kim Poong-ho – Yeon-joo's blind date (episode 6)
  as Anchorman (episodes 1, 4)
 Heo Il-hoo

Production
The series is helmed by director Jung Dae-yoon, who directed She Was Pretty, and writer Song Jae-jung, whose previous works include Nine: Nine Time Travels and Queen In-hyun's Man.

The first script reading of the drama was held in May 2016.

The drama is Han Hyo-joo's small screen comeback after six years.

Original soundtrack

Part 1

Part 2

Part 3

Part 4

Part 5

Part 6

Part 7

Part 8

Part 9

Charted songs

Album charts

Ratings

Other adaptations 
A Thai remake of the drama, Switch On was aired on Channel 3 on November 19, 2021.

An American adaptation, titled Angel City was in development at The CW. The project will be produced by CBS Studios with Craig Plestis as executive producer.

Awards and nominations

Notes

References

External links
 
 
 W at Daum 
 W at Naver Movies 

2016 South Korean television series debuts
2016 South Korean television series endings
MBC TV television dramas
South Korean fantasy television series
South Korean suspense television series
South Korean romance television series
South Korean television series remade in other languages
Works about physicians
Television shows about comics
Fictional comics
Television series about parallel universes
Television series by Chorokbaem Media
Television shows written by Song Jae-jung